Victoria Atkin is an English actress, best known for roles in Extinct, Hollyoaks, and Assassin's Creed: Syndicate.

Early years and education
Atkin attended Fernhill School and Language College, studied Dance and Theatre Performance at The University of Chichester in 2008, and took a postgraduate course in Musical Theatre at the Royal Central School of Speech and Drama in 2009.

Career
Originally training as a slalom skier, Victoria landed her first major television appearance and Series Regular role, shortly after graduating from The Royal Central School of Speech and Drama in Swiss Cottage in London.

She was cast as the first fictional transgender teenager on British television, completing 134 episodes in the role. Atkin's portrayal of her character Jasmine / Jason Costello, increased awareness for transgender people in the media.   Victoria visited Downing Street and met with Prime Minister David Cameron as well as working with Channel 4 executives to sign a memorandum of understanding to accurately portray transgender people in the media. Victoria was nominated and won various awards for Best Actress in this role.

From this, she has gone on to play a host of characters in multiple television shows in the UK and USA including the female lead, Feena in original sci-fi television series Extinct. In addition to her work theatrically Victoria is continually cast in performance capture and voiceover projects, including playable lead Evie Frye in the Assassin's Creed franchise. Victoria is the host and producer of iTunes Podcast "The Performance Capture Podcast" Sponsored by Vicon.

Filmography

Awards and nominations
In 2011, Atkin was awarded "Best Serial Drama Performance" and "Best Newcomer" by the Transgender Television Awards, for her portrayal of Jason Costello in Hollyoaks and, the same year, Hollyoaks was awarded "Best Serial Drama" for the Jason Costello storyline.

References

External links
  Official website
 

Living people
English television actresses
English soap opera actresses
Year of birth missing (living people)